The Scordisci were a Celtic Iron Age cultural group centered in the territory of present-day Serbia, at the confluence of the Savus (Sava), Dravus (Drava), Margus (Morava) and Danube rivers. They were historically notable from the beginning of the third century BC until the turn of the common era, and consolidated into a tribal state. At their zenith, their core territory stretched over regions comprising parts of present-day Serbia, Croatia, Bulgaria and Romania, while their influence spread even further. After the Roman conquest in the 1st century AD, their territories were included into the Roman provinces of Pannonia, Moesia and Dacia.

Origin
The Scordisci were a Celtic group formed after the Gallic invasion of the Balkans, or rather a "Celtic political creation" having mixed with the local Thracians and Illyrians. Their tribal name may be connected to the Scordus, the Šar Mountain. The personal names are noted to have been subsequently Illyricized, having South Pannonian–North Dalmatian influence. According to onomastic evidence, Scordiscan settlements to the east of the Morava River were Thracianized. In parts of Moesia (northeast Central Serbia) the Scordisci and Thracians lived beside each other, which is evident in the archeological findings of pits and treasures, spanning from the 3rd century BC to the 1st century BC.

The Scordisci were found during different timelines in Illyria, Thrace and Dacia, sometimes splitting into more than one group like the Scordisci Major and the Scordisci Minor.

Extensive La Tène type finds, of local production, are noted in Pannonia as well as northern Moesia Superior, attesting to the concentration of Celtic settlements and cultural contacts. However, such finds south of the Sava river are scarce.

Patterson et al. 2022 analyzed one Late La Tène 150-50 BCE sample of a 25-35 male adult from grave which contained weaponry and dog skeleton in today's town of Osijek, Croatia. He carried the Y-DNA haplogroup R1b-V88 (> R-BY17643) and mtDNA haplogroup J1c12. In a three-way admixture model, he approximately had 53.5% Early European Farmers, 38.3% Western Steppe Herders and 8.2% Western Hunter-Gatherer-related ancestry.

Domain

The Scordisci were centered in the territory of present-day Serbia, at the confluence of the Sava, Drava and Danube rivers.  The Scordisci consolidated into a tribal state. At their zenith, their core territory stretched over regions comprising parts of present-day Serbia, Croatia, Bulgaria and Romania, while their influence spread even further.

Culture
The Romans reported that they had the custom of drinking blood and that they sacrificed prisoners to deities equated with the Roman Bellona and Mars.

History

4th and 3rd century BC
Celtic expansion reached the Carpathians in the beginning of the 4th century BC. According to Livy, perhaps based on Celtic legend, the Celts that migrated to Italy and Illyria numbered 300,000. The Celts established themselves in Pannonia, subjugating the Pannonians, and in the end of the 4th century they renewed raids into the Balkans. By the early 3rd century BC, Pannonia had been Celtiziced. The Celts, retreating from Delphi (280–278 BC), settled on the mouth of the Sava and called themselves Scordisci. The Scordisci established control to the north of the Dardani. There is no mention of the Scordisci until the reign of Philip V of Macedon (r. 221–179 BC), when they emerge as Macedon allies against the Dardani and Rome. The Scordisci, having conquered the important Sava valley, the only route to Italy, in the second half of the 3rd century BC, "gradually became the most important power in the northern Balkans".

They controlled the various Pannonian groups in the region, extracting tribute and enjoying the status of the most powerful group in the central Balkans (see the Triballi, Autariatae, Dardanians and Moesians), and they erected fortresses in Singidunum (today's city of Belgrade) and Taurunum (modern Zemun). They subjugated a number of groups in Moesia, including the Dardani, several west Thracian tribes and the Paeonians.

2nd century BC

The Scordisci most likely subdued the Dardani in the mid-2nd century BC, after which there was for a long time no mention of the Dardani. From 141 BC, the Scordisci were constantly involved in battles against Roman-held Macedonia. They were defeated in 135 BC. by Cosconius in Thrace. In 118 BC, according to a memorial stone discovered near Thessalonica, Sextus Pompeius, probably the grandfather of the triumvir, was slain fighting against them near Stobi. In 114 BC, they surprised and destroyed the army of Gaius Porcius Cato in the western mountains of Serbia, but two years later they were defeated by Marcus Livius Drusus (112 BC) and a few years later again by Minucius Rufus (107 BC). However, they did not give up their claim over Pannonia, since there is mention of their involvement in the second siege of Sisak in 119 BC.

1st century BC
They still, from time to time, gave trouble to the Roman governors of Macedonia, whose territory they invaded in combination with the Maedi and Dardani. They even advanced as far as Delphi and plundered the temple; but Lucius Cornelius Scipio Asiaticus finally overcame them in 88 BC and drove them across the Danube. After this, the power of the Scordisci declined rapidly. This decline was more a result of the political situation in barbaricum rather than the effects of Roman campaigns, as their clients, especially the Pannonians, became more powerful and politically independent. Between 56 and 50 BC, the Scordisci were defeated by Burebista's Dacians, and became subject to him.

They were crushed in 15 BC by Tiberius, and became Roman subjects, playing the part as mercenaries.
Other sources say the Romans made alliance with the Scordisci in Sirmium and Danube valleys following the Alpine campaign under Tiberius in 15 BC, the alliance would be crucial for the victory over the Pannonians (15 BC) and later Breuci (12 BC).

1st century AD
Strabo's Geographica (20 BC–23 AD) mentions that one subgroup of the Scordisci, the Major Scordisci, lived between the mouth of the Sava and mouth of the Morava, while the other subgroup, the Minor Scordisci, lived to the east of the Morava, bordering the Moesi and Triballi.

They started receiving Roman citizenship during Trajan's rule (98–117 AD). With their Romanization, they ceased to exist as an independent ethno-political unit.

Archaeological sites
Singidunum (Belgrade Fortress and Karaburma)
Taurunum (Zemun)
Capedunum (Užice)

Legacy
The Scordisci are regarded as the founders of Belgrade.

See also

 Prehistoric Serbia
 List of ancient tribes in Illyria
 List of ancient cities in Illyria
 List of ancient tribes in Thrace and Dacia
 Vatin culture

References

Sources

Further reading
 Jovanović, Borislav. "The Eastern Celts and their Invasions of Hellenistic Greece and Asia Minor". In: BALCANICA XLV (2014). pp. 25-36. DOI: 10.2298/BALC1445025J

Gauls
Celtic tribes of Illyria
Ancient tribes in Serbia
Ancient tribes in Croatia
Ancient history of Vojvodina
History of Syrmia
History of Banat
History of Bačka
Šar Mountains
3rd-century BC establishments
1st-century BC disestablishments
Ancient tribes in Bulgaria
Tribes conquered by the Roman Empire
Tribes conquered by Rome